11-Dehydrocorticosterone (11-DHC), also known as 11-oxocorticosterone or 17-deoxycortisone, as well as 21-hydroxypregn-4-ene-3,11,20-trione, is a naturally occurring, endogenous corticosteroid related to cortisone and corticosterone. It is a potent mineralocorticoid, with generally greater such activity than that of corticosterone.

See also
 21-Deoxycortisone
 11-Ketoprogesterone
 11-Deoxycorticosterone

References

Primary alcohols
Enones
Mineralocorticoids
Pregnanes
Triketones